In phonetics and phonology, a bilabial stop is a type of consonantal sound, made with both lips (hence bilabial), held tightly enough to block the passage of air (hence a stop consonant). More generally, several kinds are distinguished:

 , voiceless bilabial plosive
 , voiced bilabial plosive
 , voiced bilabial nasal
 , voiceless bilabial nasal
 , voiced bilabial implosive
 , bilabial ejective (rare)

References 

Bilabial stops